Koukan Kourcia is a 2010 documentary film.

Synopsis 
The film portrays the voyage, from Niger to the Ivory Coast, of Hussey, an ageing Nigerian singer, and Sani Elhadj Magori, the director. He has asked Hussey to accompany him to the Ivory Coast to convince his father to return to his village. In the seventies, Hussey was a very well known singer and had the power to persuade young people to emigrate and try to make their fortune on the coasts of West Africa. Many young Nigerians, like the director's father, left never to come back. What sort of power does Hussey still have over the souls of men?

Awards 
 Fespaco 2011
 Milan 2011

External links 

2010 films
Nigerien documentary films
French documentary films
2010 documentary films
Documentary films about African music
Documentary films about singers
2010s French films